Pristimantis anolirex is a species of frog in the family Strabomantidae.
It is found in Colombia and Venezuela.
Its natural habitats are tropical moist montane forests, high-altitude shrubland, and high-altitude grassland.
It is threatened by habitat loss.

References

anolirex
Amphibians of Colombia
Amphibians of Venezuela
Amphibians of the Andes
Amphibians described in 1983
Taxonomy articles created by Polbot